Mario Kalinke (born  in Rostock) is a German male weightlifter, competing in the 99 kg category and representing Germany at international competitions. He participated at the 1996 Summer Olympics in the 108 kg event. He competed at world championships, including the 1997 World Weightlifting Championships.

Major results

References

External links
 

1974 births
Living people
German male weightlifters
Weightlifters at the 1996 Summer Olympics
Olympic weightlifters of Germany
Sportspeople from Rostock